"Umm Hmm" is a song by American rapper YoungBoy Never Broke Again from his fourth studio album The Last Slimeto (2022). Produced by Khris James and HitmanAudio, it peaked at number 37 on the Billboard Hot 100.

Critical reception
In a review of The Last Slimeto, Robin Murray of Clash cited the song as one of the album's rather subpar tracks, writing that it "struggles to assert itself." In contrast, Mosi Reeves of Rolling Stone considered it one of the album's standout tracks which YoungBoy is "bringing to the fore".

Charts

References

2022 songs
YoungBoy Never Broke Again songs
Songs written by YoungBoy Never Broke Again